Dasumia laevigata is a spider species from Europe.

See also 
 List of Dysderidae species

References

External links 

Dysderidae
Spiders of Europe
Spiders described in 1873